This is a list of number one popular singles on the Billboard Brasil Hot Popular chart in 2010. Note that Billboard publishes a monthly chart.

See also
Billboard Brasil
List of Hot 100 number-one singles of 2010 (Brazil)
List of number-one pop hits of 2010 (Brazil)

Brazil
2010 Popular